Devon Tower (formerly known as Canterra Tower) is a skyscraper in Calgary, Alberta, Canada.

The building was completed in 1988 and was designed by WZMH Architects in the postmodern style. It was built with glass curtain walls on all sides.

The building is owned and managed by global real estate investor, developer and owner Oxford Properties, and major tenants in the building include Devon Canada, an oil and gas company and Norton Rose Fulbright LLP, one of Canada's largest law firms.

References

Postmodern architecture in Canada
Buildings and structures in Calgary
Skyscrapers in Calgary
Oxford Properties
WZMH Architects buildings
Skyscraper office buildings in Canada
Office buildings completed in 1988